Nur Mohammad Smriti Mahavidyalaya, is a general degree college in Murshidabad district. It offers undergraduate courses in arts. It is affiliated to  University of Kalyani.

Departments

Arts

Bengali
English
History
Sociology
Education
Philosophy
Arabic

See also

References

External links
Nur Mohammad Smriti Mahavidyalaya
University of Kalyani
University Grants Commission
National Assessment and Accreditation Council

Colleges affiliated to University of Kalyani
Universities and colleges in Murshidabad district
2008 establishments in West Bengal
Educational institutions established in 2008